Bangalipur Union is a Union Council under Saidpur Upazila of Nilphamari District, in the division of Rangpur in Bangladesh. It has a total area of 41.44 square kilometres and a population of 21,379.

Geography
Two rivers flow through Bangalipur Union; the Ponchanala River and the Karatoa River. It is bounded by Saidpur Cantonment and Kamar Puku Union to the north, Belaichandi Union and Gopinathpur Union to the south, Saidpur Airport to the west and Alampur Union to its east.

Education
The Union has 2 high schools, 8 primary schools and one dakhil madrasa (Balapara Shiberhat Islami Dakhil Madrasa).

Administration 
The union is divided into 5 mouzas, with a total of 5 villages (Bangalipur, Baraishalpara, Lakshanpur West Para, Lakshanpur Charakpara and Lakshanpur Balapara/Bamonpara).

Chairmen

References 

Nilphamari District
Unions of Rangpur Division